Melampyrum sylvaticum, the small cow-wheat, is a plant species in the genus Melampyrum.

References

External links

Orobanchaceae
Flora of Europe
Plants described in 1753
Taxa named by Carl Linnaeus